Tamara Scheer (born 1979 in Vienna) is an Austrian historian.
Scheer studied history at the University of Vienna and achieved her doctorate in 2006 at the same university. Since then she taught and worked at several institutions: from 2010 to 2012 Post-Doc-Head of the Doctoral School and ÖAD-Fellow at Andrássy University Budapest, FWF-Hertha-Firnberg-Fellow at Ludwig Boltzmann Institute for Historical Social Science (2013-2017). Short-Term Fellowships brought her to Trinity College Dublin (2014), Czech Academy of Sciences (2016) European University Institut Florence (2017/18), and the University of Oslo (2018).

Since October 2017 she has been a lecturer and FWF-Elise-Richter-Fellow at the Institute for East European History/University of Vienna;

In November 2020 she habilitated, received the venia docendi for Modern and Contemporary History, at University of Vienna. Her habilitation thesis dealt with:  "Language Diversity and Loyalty in the Habsburg Army, 1867-1918."

In addition to her academic affiliation at the University of Vienna, since November 2019 she is at the Pontifical Institute Santa Maria dell' Anima in Rome. at the moment heading a project about the identification of Habsburg POWs in Italy.

Publications
Monographs
Zwischen Front und Heimat. Österreich-Ungarns Militärverwaltungen im Ersten Weltkrieg (= Neue Forschungen zur ostmittel- und südosteuropäischen Geschichte. Bd. 2). Lang, Frankfurt am Main u. a. 2009, .
 Die Ringstraßenfront. Österreich-Ungarn, das Kriegsüberwachungsamt und der Ausnahmezustand während des Ersten Weltkrieges. [Amtliche Publikation der Republik Österreich, Bundesminister für Landesverteidigung und Sport] (= Schriften des Heeresgeschichtlichen Museums. Bd. 15). Hrsg. durch die Republik Österreich, den Bundesminister für Landesverteidigung und Sport und das Heeresgeschichtliche Museum, Wien 2010, .
 „Minimale Kosten, absolut kein Blut“. Österreich-Ungarns Präsenz im Sandžak von Novipazar (1879–1908) (= Neue Forschungen zur ostmittel- und südosteuropäischen Geschichte. Bd. 5). Lang, Frankfurt am Main 2013, .
Von Friedensfurien und dalmatinischen Küstenrehen. Vergessene Wörter aus der Habsburgmonarchie. Amalthea, Wien 2019, .

Editor / Co-Author
with Wolfgang Etschmann, Erwin A. Schmidl: An der Grenze. Der erste Einrückungstermin des Bundesheeres und der Einsatz während der Ungarnkrise 1956. Eine Publikation der Landesverteidigungsakademie Wien und des Heeresgeschichtlichen Museums, Vehling, Graz 2006, .
 with Clemens Ruthner Österreich-Ungarn und Bosnien-Herzegowina, 1878-1918: Annäherungen an eine Kolonie, Tübingen: Francke Herbst 2018 (Reihe: Kultur – Herrschaft - Differenz), 
 with Markian Prokopovych, Carl Bethke Language Diversity in the Late Habsburg Empire, Brill: Leiden, 2019,

References

External links 

 
 Tamara Scheer at  Ludwig Boltzmann Gesellschaft 
 Tamara Scheer at University of Vienna
 Tamara Scheer at Academia.edu

1979 births
Living people
21st-century Austrian historians
Writers from Vienna
Austrian women historians